The 2001–02 Elitserien was the 68th season of the top division of Swedish handball. 12 teams competed in the league. The league was split into an autumn league and a spring league. The eight highest placed teams in the autumn league qualified for the spring league, whereas the four lowest placed teams qualified for Allsvenskan along with the highest placed teams from the autumn season of Division I (the second level). The six highest placed teams in the spring season of Elitserien qualified for the quarterfinals, whereas the two lowest placed teams qualified for the preliminary round of the playoffs, along with the two highest placed teams of Allsvenskan. Redbergslids IK won the regular season, but HK Drott won the playoffs and claimed their 10th Swedish title.

League tables

Autumn

Spring

Playoffs

First round

GIK Wasaiterna–IFK Tumba 18–21
IFK Tumba–GIK Wasaiterna 29–21
IFK Tumba won 50–39 on aggregate

IF Guif–H 43 22–21
H 43–IF Guif 23–23
IF Guif won 45–44 on aggregate

Quarterfinals

Redbergslids IK–IFK Tumba 34–26
IFK Tumba–Redbergslids IK 22–29
Redbergslids IK won series 2–0

IFK Ystad–Lugi HF 26–21
Lugi HF–IFK Ystad 22–15
IFK Ystad–Lugi HF 24–27
Lugi HF won series 2–1

HK Drott–IF Guif 27–24
IF Guif–HK Drott 18–31
HK Drott won series 2–0

IFK Skövde–IK Sävehof 25–23
IK Sävehof–IFK Skövde 23–20
IFK Skövde–IK Sävehof 19–27
IK Sävehof won series 2–1

Semifinals

Redbergslids IK–IK Sävehof 29–28
IK Sävehof–Redbergslids IK 20–28
Redbergslids IK won series 2–0

HK Drott–Lugi HF 24–22
Lugi HF–HK Drott 21–32
HK Drott won series 2–0

Finals

Redbergslids IK–HK Drott 25–30
HK Drott–Redbergslids IK 38–34
HK Drott won series 2–0

References 

Swedish handball competitions